is a Japanese writer. He has won the Noma Literary New Face Prize, the Izumi Kyōka Prize for Literature, the Itō Sei Literature Prize, and the Mainichi Publishing Culture Award. His work has been translated into English.

Biography
While studying Russian at Tokyo University of Foreign Studies, Shimada published a story called  that was nominated for the Akutagawa Prize. The next year he won the 6th Noma Literary New Face Prize for his novel .

 was published in Japan in 1989, with an English translation by Philip Gabriel following in 1992. In her review for The New York Times, Julia Just praised Dream Messenger as "proof that the Japanese novel is taking some fantastic turns in the hands of a new generation of writers." A 2017 retrospective review by Stephen Mansfield of The Japan Times described Dream Messenger as "existential novel that manages to remain firmly grounded within the parameters of a compelling narrative."

Shimada wrote the libretto for Shigeaki Saegusa's opera Chūshingura, which Werner Herzog directed in its 1997 Tokyo debut.

Shimada directed and performed in his own play Yurariumu (Ulalium) in 1990. His Japanese translation of Steve Erickson's Rubicon Beach appeared in 1991.

In 2016 Shimada won the 70th Mainichi Publishing Culture Award for his novel .

Recognition
 1984: 6th Noma Literary New Face Prize
 1992: 20th Izumi Kyōka Prize for Literature
 2006: 17th Itō Sei Literature Prize
 2016: 70th Mainichi Publishing Culture Award
 2022: Medal with Purple Ribbon

Bibliography
  (Kodansha, 1984). Music for a Somnambulant Kingdom
  (Kodansha, 1989). Dream Messenger, trans. Philip Gabriel (Kodansha, 1992)
Miira ni naru made (1990). Until I Am a Mummy
 Armadillo (Shinchosha, 1991), 
  (Fukutake Shoten, 1992)
Jiyū shikei (自由死刑) (1999). Death by Choice, trans. Meredith McKinney (Thames River Press, 2013)
 , Kodansha, 2015,

References

External links
Masahiko Shimada at J'Lit Books from Japan 
Synopsis of Death By Choice (Jiyu shikei) at JLPP (Japanese Literature Publishing Project) 
Interview with Shimada

1961 births
20th-century Japanese novelists
21st-century Japanese novelists
Living people
International Writing Program alumni
Recipients of the Medal with Purple Ribbon